Bonwit Teller & Co. was an American luxury department store in New York City, New York, founded by Paul Bonwit in 1895 at Sixth Avenue and 18th Street, and later a chain of department stores.

In 1897, Edmund D. Teller was admitted to the partnership and the store moved to 23rd Street, east of Sixth Avenue.

Bonwit specialized in high-end women's apparel at a time when many of its competitors were diversifying their product lines, and Bonwit Teller became noted within the trade for the quality of its merchandise as well as the above-average salaries paid to both buyers and executives. 

The partnership was incorporated in 1907 and the store moved to the corner of Fifth Avenue and 38th Street.

Throughout much of the 20th century, Bonwit was one of a group of upscale department stores on Fifth Avenue that catered to the "carriage trade".  Among its most notable peers were Lord & Taylor, and Saks Fifth Avenue.

Distinctive features

The Bonwit Teller's flagship uptown building at Fifth Avenue and 56th Street, originally known as Stewart & Company, was a women's clothing store in the "new luxury retailing district", designed by Whitney Warren and Charles Wetmore, and opened on October 16, 1929, with Eleanor Roosevelt in attendance. It was described by The New York Times as a 12-story emporium of "severe, almost unornamented limestone climbing to a ziggurat of setbacks"—as an "antithesis" of the nearby "conventional 1928 Bergdorf Goodman.

The "stupendously luxurious" entrance sharply contrasted the severity of the building itself. The entrance was "like a spilled casket of gems: platinum, bronze, hammered aluminum, orange and yellow faience, and tinted glass backlighted at night". The American Architect magazine described it in 1929 as "a sparkling jewel in keeping with the character of the store."

Originally, the "interior of Stewart & Company was just as opulent as the entrance: murals, decorative painting, and a forest of woods: satinwood, butternut, walnut, cherry, rosewood, bubinga, maple, ebony, red mahogany and Persian oak." But after Bonwit Teller took over the store in April 1930, the architect Ely Jacques Kahn stripped the interior of its decorations.

Two more floors were added to the main building in 1938 and a twelve-story addition was made to the 56th Street frontage in 1939.

Over time, the 15-foot tall limestone relief panels, depicting nearly nude women dancing, at the top of the Fifth Avenue facade, became a "Bonwit Teller signature". Donald Trump, who purchased the building thanks to Genesco's CEO John L. Hanigan, wanted to begin demolition in 1980. Trump "promised the limestone reliefs" to the Metropolitan Museum of Art. When they were "jackhammered" "to bits" the act was condemned. Through a spokesman named "John Baron"—who turned out to be Trump himself—Trump said that his company had obtained three independent appraisals of the sculptures, which he claimed had found them to be "without artistic merit." An official at the Metropolitan Museum of Art disputed the statement, stating: "Can you imagine the museum accepting them if they were not of artistic merit? Architectural sculpture of this quality is rare and would have made definite sense in our collection."  In addition to the relief panels, the huge Art Deco nickel grillwork over the entrance to the store, which had also been promised to the museum, disappeared. Again masquerading as his own spokesman "John Baron," Trump said, "We don't know what happened to it."

History

Founding and early history (1880s–1946)
In the late 1880s, Paul Bonwit opened a small millinery shop at Sixth Avenue and 18th Street in Manhattan's Ladies' Mile shopping district. In 1895, which the company often referred to as the year it was founded, Bonwit opened another store on Sixth Avenue just four blocks uptown.  When Bonwit's original business failed, Bonwit bought out his partner and opened a new store with Edmund D. Teller in 1898 on 23d Street between Fifth and Sixth Avenues.  The firm was incorporated in 1907 as Bonwit Teller & Company and in 1911 relocated yet again, this time to the corner of Fifth Avenue and Thirty-eighth Street.

They announced that this new location would provide consumers with:

In 1930, with the retail trade in New York City moving uptown, the store moved again, this time to a new address on Fifth Avenue.  Bonwit took up residence in the former Stewart & Co. building at Fifty-sixth Street, which would remain the company's flagship store for nearly fifty years.  The building had been designed by the architectural firm Warren and Wetmore in 1929 and redesigned the next year by Ely Jacques Kahn for Bonwit.

The company, in need of capital, partnered with noted financier Floyd Odlum.  Odlum, who had cashed in his stock holdings just prior to the stock market crash of 1929, was investing in firms in financial distress and in 1934 Odlum's Atlas Corporation acquired Bonwit Teller.  Odlum's wife, Hortense, who had already been serving as a consultant, was named president of Bonwit Teller in 1938, making her the first female president of a major department store in the United States.  The Odlums also retained a connection to the firm's founding family, naming Paul Bonwit's son Walter Bonwit as vice president and general manager.

For a brief time in 1939–1940, the store owned radio station WHAT in Philadelphia.

Changing ownership (1946–1979)
Floyd and Hortense Odlum would sell their investment in Bonwit Teller to Walter Hoving's Hoving Corporation.  With Bonwit Teller, Hoving would establish a strong retail presence on Fifth Avenue that would also include Tiffany & Co.

According to Fintan O'Toole, writing in The New York Review of Books in the mid-20th century, the artists Jasper Johns, Robert Rauschenberg, and Andy Warhol all worked at Bonwit Teller as window dressers (creating window displays).

The company would undergo another ownership change just ten years later with the acquisition of Bonwit by Genesco in 1956.  At the time, Genesco was a large conglomerate operating 64 apparel and retail companies.  While Genesco's portfolio included other upscale brands, including Henri Bendel, the company was largely known as a shoe retailer.  Bonwit Teller, which had developed a cutting-edge reputation promoting a young Christian Dior and other prominent American designers, gained momentum in its fashion and sales during the mid-1960s following the acquisition by Genesco.

Branch location years

Bonwit Teller had started to expand as early as 1935 when it opened a "season branch" in Palm Beach, then in 1941 it opened a full-time branch in White Plains. Another notable opening was the Boston store in 1947 in the Back Bay neighborhood. By the 1960s, there were stores operating in New York, Manhasset, White Plains, Boston, Chicago, Philadelphia, and Cleveland, as well as small resort shops in Miami and Palm Beach. During the 1960s, the company built a store in Short Hills and moved its White Plains store next to a large Lord & Taylor in Scarsdale. In the mid-1980s branches were located in Oak Brook, Illinois; Troy, Michigan; Palm Desert, California; Beverly Hills, Bal Harbour, Kansas City, Buffalo, and Columbia, South Carolina.

From the mid-1970s to late-1980s, Bonwit competed head-on with peer Saks Fifth Avenue, retaining a role on the development of fashion and design, most notably helping to launch the career of Calvin Klein.

Growth and later history (1979–2000)
In 1979, Allied Stores Corporation acquired the company. Its storied flagship Fifth Avenue store was planned to be rebuilt there opposite the new Trump Tower.  The new flagship would be the centerstone to Trump Tower's indoor mall.

In 1987, Allied Stores Corporation sold Bonwit Teller for $101 million to Hooker Corporation, an Australian business.  Hooker would expand the company's store base from five to sixteen during the period. In 1989, Bonwit was put on the auction block after the owner filed Chapter 11 bankruptcy. Under the bankruptcy strategy, Hooker kept five remaining locations.

Northeastern shopping mall magnet The Pyramid Company purchased Bonwit Teller from Hooker. They opened a store at the then soon-to-open Carousel Center complex in Syracuse, New York. During the mid-1990s, a Manhattan branch was shopped around. The venerable institution filed Chapter 11 bankruptcy in March 2000 after heightened debt.

Since 2000
In 2005, River West Brands, a Chicago-based brand revitalization company, announced it had formed Avenue Brands LLC to bring back Bonwit Teller.

In June 2008, it was announced that Bonwit Teller would be opening with eventually as many as twenty locations, beginning with New York and Los Angeles.  Perhaps due to the subsequent recession, this venture never materialized.

In March 2020, it was announced that NBT Holdings, a subsidiary of Sugar23, had acquired the rights to the brand and announced that it was planning to bring the store back.

Appearances in film and television

 In the film Desk Set (1957), Bunny Watson, played by Katharine Hepburn, stopped by "Bonwits"  on her way to her job in the reference department at the fictional Federal Broadcasting Company. She purchased a green dress.
 In the film Home Before Dark (1958), Charlotte Bronn, played by Jean Simmons, shops at Bonwit's store in Boston during a Christmas shopping spree. She sees a sparkling gold dress in the store's exterior window display, goes inside, tries it on, and purchases it, despite protests from Bonwit Teller saleswomen who tell her the size is much too large.
 In the opening scene of the film Breakfast at Tiffany's (1961), when Audrey Hepburn is driving up Fifth Avenue, the Bonwit Teller store next to Tiffany is clearly visible with a flag in front of it.
 In the film Oliver's Story (1978), starring Ryan O'Neal and Candice Bergen, Bergen plays the role of Marcie Bonwit. Later in the film, it transpires that Marcie Bonwit is an heiress to the Bonwit Teller fortune.
 In the film Rocky II (1979), Rocky Balboa shops at Bonwit's store in Philadelphia as part of a spending spree sequence.  Rocky purchases an expensive jacket (with a tiger design on the back), a fur coat for his wife, Adrian, and expensive wristwatches, including one for his brother-in-law Paulie.
 In the opening sequence of the film Die Hard with a Vengeance (1995), Bonwit's Fifth Avenue store was resurrected and is bombed by villain Simon Gruber. Bonwit had been out of business for five years by that time.
 In 2009, Bonwit Teller was written into a scene in Mad Men, a television series that explores the world of advertising. Peter Campbell, advertising account executive, returns a Bonwit Teller dress to its Fifth Avenue store, where he discovers that Joan Holloway, a former co-worker, is now employed there as a sales clerk.
 In the Hallmark Channel television film Window Wonderland (2013), a window dresser (played by Chyler Leigh) explains how Salvador Dalí dressed windows at Bonwit's in his surrealist style.

References

 Quick History of Store
 "The Decline of Bonwit Teller: Did Time Pass Retailer By?".  The New York Times, April 14, 1990
 "Mildred Custin, 91, Retailer; Made Bonwit's Fashion Force".  The New York Times, April 1, 1997
 The Grand Emporiums: The Illustrated History of America's Great Department Stores. Robert Hendrickson, Stein & Day, 1980.
 Department Store Museum. The Department Store Museum: Entry on Bonwit Teller

External links 
 

1895 establishments in New York City
1990 disestablishments in New York (state)
1990 mergers and acquisitions
1990 in New York City
American companies disestablished in 1990
American companies established in 1895
Companies based in Manhattan
Companies that filed for Chapter 11 bankruptcy in 1989
Companies that filed for Chapter 11 bankruptcy in 2000
Defunct department stores based in New York City
Former buildings and structures in Manhattan
Defunct companies based in New York City
Sixth Avenue
Retail companies established in 1895
Retail companies disestablished in 1990